The 2015–16 GMHL season was the tenth season of the Greater Metro Junior A Hockey League (GMHL). The thirty-two teams of the GMHL played 42-game schedules.

Starting in February 2016, the top teams of the league played down for the Russell Cup, emblematic of the grand championship of the GMHL. Since the GMHL is independent from Hockey Canada and the Canadian Junior Hockey League, this is where the GMHL's season ended.

Changes 
Expansion granted to the Bobcaygeon Storm of Bobcaygeon, Ontario.
Expansion granted to the Brantford Steelfighters of Brantford, Ontario. Brantford folded and was removed from the league schedule on November 5, 2015.
Cambridge Bears take season off to restructure.
Expansion granted to the Colborne Chiefs of Colborne, Ontario.
Expansion granted to the Coldwater Falcons of Coldwater, Ontario.
Expansion granted to the Grey County Grizzlies of Grey County, Ontario.  Grey County folded and was removed from the league schedule on December 2, 2015.
Expansion granted to the Haliburton Wolves of Haliburton, Ontario.
Expansion granted to the Kingsville Kings of Kingsville, Ontario.
Expansion granted to the Komoka Dragons of Komoka, Ontario.
Expansion granted to the London Lakers of London, Ontario.
Expansion granted to the Norfolk Vikings of Norfolk, Ontario.
Orangeville Americans renamed Orangeville Ice Crushers.
Expansion granted to the Oshawa Riverkings of Oshawa, Ontario.
Rama Aces take season off to restructure.
Shelburne Stars renamed Shelburne Sharks.
Sturgeon Falls Lumberjacks folded February 1, 2016.

Current Standings 
Note: GP = Games played; W = Wins; L = Losses; T = Tie; OTL = Overtime losses; GF = Goals for; GA = Goals against; PTS = Points; x = clinched playoff berth; q = relegated to qualifier round; y = clinched division title; z = clinched league title

Teams listed on the official league website.

Standings listed on official league website.

2016 Russell Cup Playoffs

North Division

Central Division

South Division

8th Place Qualifiers
North Division

Central Division

South Division

Playoff results are listed on the official league website.

Scoring leaders 
Note: GP = Games played; G = Goals; A = Assists; Pts = Points; PIM = Penalty minutes

Leading goaltenders 
Note: GP = Games played; Mins = Minutes played; W = Wins; L = Losses: OTL = Overtime losses; SL = Shootout losses; GA = Goals Allowed; SO = Shutouts; GAA = Goals against average

Awards
Top Scorer: Matt Fischer (Tottenham Steam)
Most Valuable Player: Slava Chegrintcev (Alliston Coyotes)
Rookie of the Year: Kyle Challis (Bracebridge Blues)
Top Forward: Ludwig Niederbach (Kingsville Kings)
Top Defenceman: Kevin Walker (Tottenham Steam)
Top Goaltender: Jan Pechek (Kingsville Kings)
Top Defensive Forward: Erik Erkers (Almaguin Spartans)
Most Sportsmanlike Player: Graham Pickard (Tottenham Steam)
Most Heart: Alfred Panelin-Borg (South Muskoka Shield)
Top Coach: Jesse Cook (Toronto Attack)

See also 
 2015 in ice hockey
 2016 in ice hockey

References

External links 
 Official website of the Greater Metro Junior A Hockey League

GMHL
Greater Metro Junior A Hockey League seasons